HD 19467 B (also stylized as HD 19467 b) is a brown dwarf or a super-Jupiter exoplanet orbiting around the Sun-like star, HD 19467 approximately 101 light-years away in the constellation of Eridanus.

References

T-type stars
Exoplanets discovered in 2016
Giant planets
Exoplanets detected by direct imaging
Eridanus (constellation)